The Allison family were a Canadian family of 1st-class passengers on board the RMS Titanic, which struck an iceberg and sank on April 15, 1912.

The family consisted of Hudson Joshua Creighton Allison (December 9, 1881 – April 15, 1912); his wife, Bess Waldo Allison (née Daniels; November 14, 1886 – April 15, 1912); their daughter, Helen Loraine Allison (June 5, 1909 – April 15, 1912); and son, Hudson Trevor Allison (May 7, 1911 – August 7, 1929). Of the family, only Trevor survived.

History
The Allison family, bound for Montreal, booked first-class passage on the Titanic. They boarded the ship in Southampton along with four servants: a maid, Sarah Daniels (no relation to Bess); a nurse, Alice Cleaver; a cook, Amelia Mary "Mildred" Brown; and a butler, George Swane. Hudson and Bess occupied cabin C-22, Sarah and Loraine occupied C-24, and Alice and Trevor occupied C-26. Two second-class cabins were also booked for George and Mildred.

Hudson and Bess were dining companions with Major Arthur Godfrey Peuchen. At dinner on 14 April, they brought Loraine to the dining room with them so she could see how pretty it was.

After the ship struck the iceberg, Hudson left to find out what was going on. While he was gone, Alice took Trevor and went to get the rest of the servants in second class. Hudson returned to find them gone. He delivered Bess and Loraine to Boat 6, and apparently left before it was launched. Major Peuchen recalled how they were almost rescued: 

George saw Alice, Mildred, and Trevor safely into Boat 11, which left the ship at around 1:45 am, nearly an hour after Boat 6 had. Sarah had gone up on deck early to investigate the commotion and was hurriedly placed into a boat by a steward who promised to inform the Allisons of her whereabouts. Varying stories claim that Alice panicked and grabbed Trevor, without informing Bess that she was leaving, and that Bess refused to leave the ship without him, though it is possible that the entire group went up on deck together, and that Alice and Trevor were simply lost in the crowd.

Hudson, Bess, Loraine, and George were lost in the sinking. Whether or not George found the Allisons and informed them that Trevor was safely off the ship is unknown, but if he did, it is likely the information came too late for any of them to leave the ship. Bess was one of only four first-class women (including Ida Straus, Edith Corse Evans, and Ann Elizabeth Isham) who perished, while Loraine was the only child of first and second class to do so. Hudson's body was the 135th recovered by the Mackay-Bennett; George's was the 294th. Hudson's body was transported to Chesterville, Ontario, to be buried in the family plot in Maple Ridge Cemetery.

Alice and Trevor were met in New York City by Hudson's brother, George, who, along with his wife, Lillian, took custody of the now orphaned Trevor. He died on August 7, 1929, at age 18 of food poisoning. He was buried beside Hudson.

Claim by Helen Loraine Kramer to be Loraine Allison
In 1940, a woman named Helen Loraine Kramer claimed that she was Loraine Allison and that, at the last minute, her parents gave her up to a man calling himself Hyde (whose identity she said to be that of shipbuilder Thomas Andrews), who raised her on a farm in the American Midwest. Her claim, however, was not accepted by the Allisons. Eventually, she moved away, dying in 1992, and they never heard from her again.

In December 2013, the Loraine Allison Identification Project announced results of mitochondrial DNA testing performed on a sample donated by a female-line descendant of Kramer, and descendants of the Allisons. The test was performed by DNA Diagnostics Center, a facility accredited by the American Society of Crime Laboratory Directors. The results were negative, demonstrating that no genetic relationship existed between Kramer and the Allisons.

The Allisons in film
The 1912 German silent film about the disaster, In Nacht und Eis ('In Night and Ice'), includes the Allison family story, but not by name.

The Allisons were major characters in the 1996 miniseries Titanic. The subplot regarding them was highly fictionalized and filled with historical inaccuracies: for example, it added the story of the long-standing myth that Alice (portrayed by Felicity Waterman) was a child murderess who stole Trevor in a fit of panic, thus forcing the rest of the family to remain on the ship looking for him until it was too late. Their other servants (Sarah, Mildred, and George) were not featured in it – the only one shown travelling with them was Alice.

While the Allisons are not featured in the 1997 film Titanic, one brief shot in the movie during the sinking where a little girl looks up in wonder at a ship's rocket is speculated to be Loraine.

The Allisons are also featured in the 2012 miniseries Titanic.

References

Canadian families
People from Montreal
People from the United Counties of Stormont, Dundas and Glengarry
Deaths on the RMS Titanic
Deaths from food poisoning